Edgar Leonel Godoy Samayoa (21 January 1949 – 22 April 2021) was a Guatemalan politician and military who served as Minister of the Interior from January to June 2020.

References

1949 births
2021 deaths
Guatemalan generals
Guatemalan military personnel
Government ministers of Guatemala